William Camilo Hurtado Ortiz (born 31 May 2004) is a Colombian footballer who currently plays as a midfielder for Envigado.

Career statistics

Club

Notes

References

2004 births
Living people
People from Tumaco
Colombian footballers
Association football midfielders
Categoría Primera A players
Envigado F.C. players
Sportspeople from Nariño Department
21st-century Colombian people